MIAT Mongolian Airlines serves the following scheduled international destinations as of June 2021:

List

References

Lists of airline destinations